This was the first edition of the tournament.

Romain Arneodo and Tristan-Samuel Weissborn won the title after defeating Roman Jebavý and Adam Pavlásek 6–4, 6–3 in the final.

Seeds

Draw

References

External links
 Main draw

BW Open - Doubles